The 99th Military Base Deveselu, or the Deveselu Military Base, is a Romanian NATO base hosting the United States Navy Aegis Ashore Ballistic Missile Defense System. The base consists of three military units: The Romanian 99th Military Base, which hosts two American bases: the Naval Support Facility Deveselu and the Aegis Ashore Defense System Romania.

The Deveselu base is operated by about 500 Romanian soldiers, 250 U.S. troops, and other personnel. The current base commander is Colonel Marius Chiriță.

History

The construction of the military air base at Deveselu started in 1952, with assistance from the Soviet Union. The first supersonic flight with a MiG-19 happened at the base. It was also the first base to receive MiG-21F-13 fighters in 1962, these aircraft equipping a squadron from the 91st Fighter Aviation Regiment.

By the 1980s, the air base had become the most important one in Romania, housing four squadrons and 100 pilots. During the 1990s, it was the only air base in the country from where night missions were conducted. The base was disbanded in 2003 and approximately 200 personnel were retired.

2010–present

In February 2010, the Supreme Council of National Defence decided for Romania to participate in the development of the American anti-missile defense component, at the invitation of President Barack Obama. A year later, in September 2011, the former aviation base was selected to host SM-3 interceptor missiles. Construction started in October 2013, with a ceremony attended by President Traian Băsescu and Under Secretary of Defense for Policy James N. Miller. 

On 1 May 2012,  was established. The inauguration ceremony was held in December 2015. The Aegis Ashore Site became operational in May 2016. According to major general Charles Miller, "Aegis Ashore Romania is designed to protect European NATO Allies and U.S. deployed forces in the region against the growing threat posed by the proliferation of ballistic missiles outside the Euro-Atlantic area." The defense system is under the operational control of United States Naval Forces Europe-Africa, based in Naples, Italy. The current commander of Aegis Ashore Romania is Cmdr. Jonathan P. Schermerhorn, who replaced Cmd. Frederick G. Hettling in October 2022.

In 2019, the system underwent an upgrade program. During the modernization works, the United States military temporarily installed Terminal High Altitude Area Defense (THAAD) systems at the base. After the completion of the upgrade process these systems were redeployed. This missile defense facility is designed to detect, track, engage, and destroy ballistic missiles in flight outside the atmosphere; it works in coordination with the four forward-deployed Europe naval forces' Aegis destroyers.

On 29 April 2022, the military colours of the 99th Military Base Deveselu were decorated with the Order of Military Virtue by General Daniel Petrescu at the 10th anniversary ceremony of its establishment.

The $800 million facility was originally intended to intercept incoming missiles from Iran, but has been deemed a "direct threat" by Russian officials. The Aegis Ashore missile defense system at Deveselu (and another one under construction in Redzikowo, Poland), has been brought up by Russian President Vladimir Putin as an example of NATO’s increasing influence in Eastern Europe.

Capabilities

Like the ship-based variant, the Aegis Ashore uses the AN/SPY-1 radar, as well as the same Command, Control, Communication, Computers and Intelligence (C4I) systems, computer processors, and Raytheon SM-3 missiles. In 2019, the Deveselu site has been upgraded to use the SM-3 Block IB interceptor. The Block IB  offers enhanced capabilities in identifying and tracking targets compared to prior versions. According to Commander John Fitzpatrick, as of 2019, there are 24 SM-3 ballistic missile interceptors at the facility mounted on Mark 41 Vertical Launch Systems. The same launchers can be used to fire a range of surface-to-air missiles and other offensive weapons, including Tomahawk cruise missiles, but the launchers at Deveselu had been "configured" and "installed" so that they can only launch SM-3 missiles.

In the wake of the 2022 Russian invasion of Ukraine, the Aegis Ashore Missile Defense Complex in Deveselu has assumed an essential role for the security of the NATO Alliance; the SM-3 interceptors have the capability to destroy slower, medium-range ballistic missiles with potential nuclear payload during mid-course flight, but probably wouldn't work against hypersonic weapons according to Kingston Reif, Director for Disarmament and Threat Reduction Policy.

According to Russian sources, the Aegis Ashore base at Deveselu could be hit with Kinzhal hypersonic air-to-surface missiles, which would be able to "sweep away" the Aegis batteries with conventional warheads even before they could be put on alert. On the other hand, military experts such as Pavel Felgenhauer or James M. Acton do not consider that these hypersonic missiles offer a strategic advantage, or pose a significantly higher threat than conventional missiles.

See also
57th Air Base "Mihail Kogălniceanu"
NATO missile defence system
Aegis Ballistic Missile Defense System
United States missile defense complex in Poland
List of United States military bases
Vin americanii!

References

Romanian Air Force bases
United States Navy installations
Buildings and structures in Olt County
1952 establishments in Romania